Tolga Seyhan (born January 17, 1977) is a Turkish former footballer. He was born in Giresun, a city on the Black Sea.

Club career
Tolga started out his career as a striker at Giresun Şafakspor. He continued at this position for a number of years and at several clubs including Sivasspor, Düzcespor and Çanakkale Dardanelspor. It was here that he was originally moved to defence, and he took it in his stride as he made the position of central defence his own.

He soon joined Malatyaspor and was extremely impressive as Malatyaspor defied expectations to remain in the Turkish Süper Lig in their first season in the top flight, in the 2001/2002 season. The next season was even more impressive as a late season run enabled Malatyaspor to claim a UEFA Cup place for the next season. By this point, Tolga had made his first appearances for the Turkish national team and was being courted by many clubs, but remained with Malatyaspor for the beginning of the next season.

When the Malatyaspor manager Ziya Doğan left to join Trabzonspor in January 2004 he took Tolga with him. Tolga has since developed into one of the best defenders in Turkish football.

Eighteen months later, Tolga was bought by the Ukrainian team Shakhtar Donetsk.

Tolga is a powerful big defender who uses his frame to stifle opponents in the air and on the ground. He is very quick for his size and despite playing in defence still impresses with the number of goals he scores, obviously due to his experience in playing for many years as a striker. Tolga obtained Ukrainian championship and is thinking about a comeback to Trabzonspor.

In July 2006, Galatasaray had made an agreement with Tolga to play for them, on loan for one season.

In July 2010, he returned to where he was born, Giresun, for a one year contract with Giresunspor, playing in Turkish 1st division "Bank Asya League". Giresunspor's board decided to give him the captain armband.

Honours

Club
Trabzonspor
Turkish Cup: 2003–04

References

External links

1977 births
Living people
Turkish footballers
Turkey international footballers
Turkey B international footballers
Turkish expatriate footballers
Galatasaray S.K. footballers
Dardanelspor footballers
Malatyaspor footballers
Kocaelispor footballers
Trabzonspor footballers
FC Shakhtar Donetsk players
Gaziantepspor footballers
Giresunspor footballers
Hacettepe S.K. footballers
Süper Lig players
Ukrainian Premier League players
Expatriate footballers in Ukraine
Association football fullbacks
Association football central defenders
Turkish expatriate sportspeople in Ukraine